Ole Fredrik Syversen (born 16 December 1971) is a Norwegian athlete who competed in Wheelchair curling at the 2018 Winter Paralympics. He won a silver medal.

References

External links 

1971 births
Living people
Norwegian male curlers
Norwegian wheelchair curlers
Paralympic wheelchair curlers of Norway
Paralympic medalists in wheelchair curling
Paralympic silver medalists for Norway
Wheelchair curlers at the 2018 Winter Paralympics
Wheelchair curlers at the 2022 Winter Paralympics
Medalists at the 2018 Winter Paralympics
World wheelchair curling champions
Place of birth missing (living people)
21st-century Norwegian people